Israel Heymann Jonas (1795-1851) was a German malacologist. He studied medicine at the Christian-Albrechts-Universität in Kiel, Prussia.

Species named by Jonas
The World Register of Marine Species has 104 records of marine taxa named by Jonas. Most of these names have become synonyms, except:

Species named in honor of Jonas
Hombron & Jacquinot naming a genus Jonas in honor of him; this is a crab genus in the family Corystidae. A number of marine gastropod species use the epithet "jonasii" or jonasi in his honor.
 Arcularia jonasii (Dunker, 1846): synonym of  Nassarius jonasii Dunker, 1846
 Baseodiscus jonasii Strand, Hjelmgren & Sundberg, 2005
 Buccinum jonasii Dunker, 1846: synonym of  Nassarius jonasii Dunker, 1846
 Nassa jonasii (Dunker, 1846): synonym of  Nassarius jonasii Dunker, 1846
 Nassarius jonasii Dunker, 1846
 Parcanassa jonasii (Dunker, 1846): synonym of  Nassarius jonasii Dunker, 1846
 Siphonaria jonasi Dunker, 1853: synonym of  Siphonaria pectinata (Linnaeus, 1758)

Publications
Jonas sometimes also published as "J." H. Jonas.

He studied, together with Wilhelm Dunker, the "Museum Gruneri", a large collection of species in the bivalve family Pteriidae. This study was published as Verzeichniß der Conchyliensammlung des verstorbenen Herrn Consul Gruner, welche im Ganzen verkauft werden soll von Bunsen Hausschild 1857. Bremer Druck 1857.

In 1846 Jonas described the "Rodatz collection". Rodatz collected many mollusks during a number of commercial expeditions from Germany to Zanzibar and West Africa in the period of 184351, and from the Red Sea in 1845.

References

  Collations of Malacological Significance; American Malacological Society

1795 births
1851 deaths
German malacologists